"All the Reasons Why" is a song written by Paulette Carlson and Beth Nielsen Chapman, and recorded by American country music group Highway 101.  It was released in September 1988 as the second single from their album 101².  The song reached #5 on the Billboard Hot Country Singles chart in January 1989.

Chart performance

References

1988 singles
1988 songs
Highway 101 songs
Songs written by Beth Nielsen Chapman
Song recordings produced by Paul Worley
Warner Records singles
Songs written by Paulette Carlson